Strupice may refer to the following places in Poland:
Strupice, Lower Silesian Voivodeship (south-west Poland)
Strupice, Świętokrzyskie Voivodeship (south-central Poland)